Świder is a river in Masovia, Poland. It is a tributary to the Vistula near Otwock.

Rivers of Poland
Rivers of Masovian Voivodeship